Grabowa may refer to the following places:
Grabowa (river), a river in Pomerania, northern Poland
Grabowa, Opoczno County in Łódź Voivodeship (central Poland)
Grabowa, Wieluń County in Łódź Voivodeship (central Poland)
Grabowa, Świętokrzyskie Voivodeship (south-central Poland)
Grabowa, Gmina Potworów in Masovian Voivodeship (east-central Poland)
Grabowa, Gmina Rusinów in Masovian Voivodeship (east-central Poland)
Grabowa, Greater Poland Voivodeship (west-central Poland)
Grabowa, Częstochowa County in Silesian Voivodeship (south Poland)